Alvarães is a municipality located in the Brazilian state of Amazonas. Its population was 16,220 (2020) and its area is 5,912 km².

The municipality contains about 37% of the Tefé National Forest, created in 1989.

References

Municipalities in Amazonas (Brazilian state)
Populated places on the Amazon